Tetragonus is a genus of moths of the family Callidulidae.

Species
Tetragonus catamitus Geyer, 1832
Tetragonus lycaenoides (Felder, 1874)

References

External links
Tetragonus at the Moths of Borneo

Callidulidae